Tichafa is a Zimbabwean masculine given name. Notable people with the name include:

Tichafa Samuel Parirenyatwa (1927–1962), Zimbabwe physician 
Mike Tichafa Karakadzai (1957–2013), Zimbabwean military officer

African masculine given names